The Triumph may refer to
, several vessels of the Royal Navy
The Triumph – An alternative title in some countries for the made-for-TV film The Ron Clark Story
The Triumph, a Scottish country dance
A 1917 book by William Nathaniel Harben